Dammarane is a tetracyclic triterpene found in sapogenins (forming triterpenoid saponins) like those of ginseng (ginsenosides: panaxatriol and protopanaxadiol).  Compounds of the series were first isolated from and named after dammar resin, a natural resin from tropical trees of the Dipterocarp family.

References

External links
 Numbering of dammarane according to IUPAC Recommendations

Steroids
Triterpenes